Thomas Thurlow (1737–1791) was an English bishop.

Life
Thurlow was born in 1737 in Ashfield, Suffolk, the second son Rev. Thomas Thurlow (died 1762), rector of Little Ashfield. His older brother was Lord Chancellor Edward, Lord Thurlow.

Thurlow matriculated at The Queen's College, Oxford in 1754, aged 18, but transferred to Magdalen College, Oxford, where he held a  demyship 1755–1759 then a fellowship 1759–1772, graduating B.A. 1758, M.A. 1761, B.D. 1769, D.D. 1772.

He became Rector of Stanhope, County Durham in 1771, Master of the Temple in 1772, Dean of Rochester in 1775, Bishop of Lincoln in 1779, additionally Dean of St Paul's in commendam in 1782, and was Bishop of Durham from 1787 until his death.

He died in Portland Place, London, on 27 May 1791, and was buried in Temple Church.

Legacy
His rectum is displayed in the Hunterian Museum in London, with the following description:
"A rectum showing the effects of both haemorrhoids and bowel cancer. The patient in this case was Thomas Thurlow (1737-1791), the Bishop of Durham. Thurlow had suffered from some time from a bowel complaint, which he initially thought was the result of piles. He consulted John Hunter after a number of other physicians and surgeons had failed to provide him with a satisfactory diagnosis. Hunter successfully identified the tumour through rectal examination, but recognised that it was incurable. Thurlow died 10 months later."

Family
Thurlow married Anne Beere, daughter of William Beere. They had the following children:

 Amelia Anne Thurlow (1779–1809), married in 1799 Lieut.-Gen. Sir Edward Howarth 
 Edward Hovell-Thurlow (1781–1829), poet, succeeded as 2nd Baron Thurlow in 1806, married in 1813 Mary Catherine Bolton, actress
 Elizabeth Thurlow
 Anne Elizabeth Thurlow (1784–1875), married in 1804 Charles Godfrey
 Rev. Thomas Thurlow (1788–1874), Rector of Boxford, Suffolk, married in 1811 Maria Frances Lyon, daughter of Thomas Lyon

Notes

1737 births
1791 deaths
Alumni of The Queen's College, Oxford
Alumni of Magdalen College, Oxford
Bishops of Lincoln
Bishops of Durham
Deans of St Paul's
Deans of Rochester
Masters of the Temple
18th-century Church of England bishops
Deaths from colorectal cancer